Margaret O'Donnell may refer to:

Margaret O'Donnell (poet), see 1963 in poetry
Margaret O'Donnell (tennis), see 1952 Australian Championships – Women's Singles
Margaret O'Donnell, character in 17 Again (film)